Mangelia striolata is a species of sea snail, a marine gastropod mollusk in the family Mangeliidae.

Description
The length of the shell varies between 4 mm and 15 mm.

Distribution
This species occurs in European waters off Portugal and Spain, and in the Mediterranean Sea off Greece and Italy

References

 Spada G. & Della Bella G. (2010). Identification of Mangelia striolata, type species of the genus Mangelia  Risso, 1826. Bollettino Malacologico, 46: 76–83

External links
  Risso A. (1826–1827). Histoire naturelle des principales productions de l'Europe Méridionale et particulièrement de celles des environs de Nice et des Alpes Maritimes. Paris, Levrault: Vol. 1: XII + 448 + 1 carta [1826]. Vol. 2: VII + 482 + 8 pl. (fiori) [novembre 1827]. Vol. 3: XVI + 480 + 14 pl. (pesci) [settembre 1827]. Vol. 4: IV + 439 + 12 pl. (molluschi)
 
  Tucker, J.K. 2004 Catalog of recent and fossil turrids (Mollusca: Gastropoda). Zootaxa 682:1–1295.
 MNHN, Paris: Mangelia striolata

striolata
Gastropods described in 1826